
The Columbia Glacier is a glacier in Prince William Sound on the south coast of the U.S. state of Alaska, is one of the fastest moving glaciers in the world, and has been retreating since the early 1980s.  It was named after Columbia University, one of several glaciers in the area named for elite U.S. colleges by the Harriman Alaska Expedition in 1899. The head of the main branch of the glacier originates at the saddle between Mount Witherspoon and Mount Einstein.

The Alaska Marine Highway vessel M/V Columbia is named after the Columbia Glacier.

Size

The glacier twists its way through western Alaska's Chugach Mountains. The bald streak at the bottom of the mountains, called the trimline, shows this glacier has lost  of thickness. It has also retreated  since that measurement was taken.

Retreat

In the next few decades it is expected to retreat another , to a point where the bed of the glacier rises above sea level. Columbia Glacier's retreat should be completed around 2020. Tidewater glacier advance and retreat is not directly forced by climate (adjacent tidewater glaciers may be simultaneously advancing and retreating), but rapid retreat appears to be triggered by climate-forced long-term thinning.

See also 

Columbia Icefield
List of glaciers
Columbia Peak (Alaska)

References

External links

 Video contains footage of glacier calving

Articles containing video clips
Glaciers of Alaska
Glaciers of Chugach Census Area, Alaska
Glaciers of Copper River Census Area, Alaska
Glaciers of Unorganized Borough, Alaska